The 53rd Golden Globe Awards, honoring the best in film and television for 1995, were held on January 21, 1996 at The Beverly Hilton. The nominations were announced on December 21, 1995.

Winners and nominees

Film 

The following films received multiple nominations:

The following films received multiple wins:

Television 

The following programs received multiple nominations:

The following programs received multiple wins:

Ceremony

Presenters 
 Anne Archer
 Nicolas Cage
 Michael Crichton
 Jamie Lee Curtis
 David Duchovny
 Laurence Fishburne
 Joely Fisher
 Faith Ford
 Jodie Foster
 Dennis Franz
 Tom Hanks
 Teri Hatcher
 Joanna Kerns
 Eriq La Salle
 Angela Lansbury
 Chris O'Donnell
 Edward James Olmos
 David Paymer
 Jane Seymour
 Alicia Silverstone
 Lea Thompson
 John Travolta

Cecil B. DeMille Award 
 Sean Connery

Mr. Golden Globe 
 Freddie Prinze Jr. (son of Freddie Prinze and Katherine Prinze)

Miss Golden Globe 
 Jaime Dudney (daughter of Barbara Mandrell and Ken Dudney)

Awards breakdown 
The following networks received multiple nominations:

The following networks received multiple wins:

See also
 68th Academy Awards
 16th Golden Raspberry Awards
 2nd Screen Actors Guild Awards
 47th Primetime Emmy Awards
 48th Primetime Emmy Awards
 49th British Academy Film Awards
 50th Tony Awards
 1995 in film
 1995 in American television

References

053
1995 film awards
1995 television awards
January 1996 events in the United States
Golden